The following is a list of notable people from Jordan:

Academics
 Ali H. Nayfeh
 Rana Dajani
 Ibrahim al-Kufahi
 Lubna Tahtamouni

Artists
 Muhanna Al-Dura
 George Aleef
 Wijdan Ali
 Mahmoud Taha

Athletes
Amer Deeb 
Dima and Lama Hattab - ultramarathon runners
Assad Wasfi

Musicians
 Belly
 Zade Dirani
 Diana Karazon
 Ayah Marrar
 Hani Mitwasi
 Adham Nabulsi
 Hani Naser
 Mahmoud Radaideh
 Mai Selim
 Farah Siraj
 Iyad Sughayer

Novelists, poets, researchers and writers
Nasr Abdel Aziz Eleyan
Samer Libdeh - researcher, writer
Suleiman Mousa - historian, writer
Haider Mahmoud - poet, writer
Abdel-Rahman Munif - novelist
Samer Raimouny - poet, activist
Mustafa Wahbi (Mustafa Wahbi Al Tal) - poet
Ziyad Qasim - novelist

Physicians
Abdelsalam al-Majali
Daoud Hanania
Tareq Suheimat

Lawyers
Mahmoud Hanandeh

Business people
Iman Mutlaq
Mary Nazzal-Batayneh
Mohammed Shehadeh

Actors

 Mondher Rayahneh (born 8 April 1979 in Irbid) 
 Yasser Al-Masri (22 November 1970 – 23 August 2018)
 Juliet Awwad (born July 7, 1951 in Amman, Jordan)
 Margo Haddad (born February 26, 1988)
 Mais Hamdan (born October 31, 1982)
 Abeer Issa (born 25 April 1961)
 Saba Mubarak (born April 10, 1976 in Anjara)
 Nadim Sawalha (born 9 September 1935) 
 Nabil Sawalha

Military
 Brigadier Mohammad Jamhour
 Captain Muath al-Kasasbeh - Royal Jordanian Air Force pilot captured, held hostage, and burned alive by the Islamic State of Iraq and the Levant
 Habis Al-Majali
 Abdelsalam al-Majali
 General Muhammad Suheimat (died 1968)

Politicians
Ahmad Obeidat, former Prime Minister of Jordan
Mithqal Al-Fayez
Bisher Al-Khasawneh, current Prime Minister of Jordan
Akef Al-Fayez, former Deputy Prime Minister and other ministerial offices
Maha Ali
Ismael Babouk, first Mayor of Amman (1909-1911)
Fahad Ensour
Thouqan Hindawi, former minister
Awn Khasawneh, former Prime Minister and former judge of the International Court of Justice
Faisal al-Fayez, former Prime Minister and current President of the Senate
Prince Rashed Al-Khuzai
Abdelsalam Al-Majali
Hakem Al-Fayez
Hind Al-Fayez, MP
Ina'am Al-Mufti, first Jordanian woman to hold government office
Ali Abu al-Ragheb
Eid Al-Fayez, former Minister of Labour, Minister of State, and Minister of Interior
Ali Suheimat
Abdelraouf Rawabdeh, former Prime Minister of Jordan 
Attallah Suheimat
Salah Suheimat, MP
Tareq Suheimat
Bahjat Talhouni, former Prime Minister
 Nabil Talhouni, ambassador
Fayez Tarawneh
Alia Abu Tayeh, senator

Other
Shereen Audi (born 1970), visual artist
Mona Saudi (born 1945), sculptor
Amer Al-Barkawi (born June 20, 1997), professional Esports player

References

Lists of Arabs